David Zamora Casas (born 1960) is a Mexican-American visual artist, performance artist, and community activist based in San Antonio, Texas who has been active since 1985. His work addresses his identity as a gay Chicano artist and explores themes of androgyny, queerness, and redefining traditional Mexican art. Casas is a self-described "artivist" who creates paintings, installations, altars, and performance works.

Chicano art scholar and specialist Tomás Ybarra-Frausto, who notably wrote about rasquache, described Casas's canvases as a "mix word and image to visualize autobiographical and universal stories of homoerotic love, loss and persistent social concerns including immigration, environmental plunder, gender disparity and the multiple issues facing marginalized individuals and communities."

References 

Chicano
Living people
LGBT Hispanic and Latino American people
LGBT people from Texas
American LGBT artists
Queer artists
1960 births
American artists of Mexican descent
21st-century LGBT people
Hispanic and Latino American artists